Burleson County is a county located in the U.S. state of Texas. As of the 2020 census, the population was 17,642. Its county seat is Caldwell. The county is named for Edward Burleson, a general and statesman of the Texas Revolution.

Burleson County is part of the College Station-Bryan Metropolitan Statistical Area.

Geography

Major highways
  State Highway 21
  State Highway 36

Adjacent counties
 Robertson County (north)
 Brazos County (northeast)
 Washington County (southeast)
 Lee County (southwest)
 Milam County (northwest)

Demographics

Note: the US Census treats Hispanic/Latino as an ethnic category. This table excludes Latinos from the racial categories and assigns them to a separate category. Hispanics/Latinos can be of any race.

As of the 2000 census, there were 16,470 people, 6,363 households, and 4,574 families residing in the county. The population density was 25 people per square mile (10/km2). There were 8,197 housing units at an average density of 12 per square mile (5/km2).  The racial makeup of the county was 74.07% white, 15.06% black or African American, 0.50% Native American, 0.17% Asian, 0.02% Pacific Islander, 8.25% from other races, and 1.92% from two or more races. 14.64% of the population were Hispanic or Latino of any race. 18.8% were of German, 11.3% American, 10.7% Czech and 6.2% Irish ancestry according to Census 2000.

There were 6,363 households, out of which 31.90% had children under the age of 18 living with them, 56.40% were married couples living together, 11.40% had a female householder with no husband present, and 28.10% were non-families. 24.90% of all households were made up of individuals, and 12.40% had someone living alone who was 65 years of age or older. The average household size was 2.57 and the average family size was 3.08.

In the county, the population was spread out, with 26.90% under the age of 18, 8.00% from 18 to 24, 25.80% from 25 to 44, 23.20% from 45 to 64, and 16.10% who were 65 years of age or older. The median age was 38 years. For every 100 females, there were 94.70 males. For every 100 females age 18 and over, there were 91.50 males.

The median income for a household in the county was $33,026, and the median income for a family was $39,385. Males had a median income of $28,795 versus $20,146 for females. The per capita income for the county was $16,616. About 13.20% of families and 17.20% of the population were below the poverty line, including 22.90% of those under age 18 and 14.30% of those age 65 or over.

Communities

Cities
 Caldwell (county seat)
 Snook
 Somerville

Census-designated places

 Beaver Creek
 Cade Lakes
 Clay
 Deanville
 Lyons
 Tunis

Other unincorporated communities

 Chriesman
 Cooks Point
 Frenstat
 Gus
 Hix
 Hogg
 Rita
 Wilcox

Ghost towns 

 Birch
 Chances Store
 Goodwill
 Merle\
 Scofield

Politics

Education
School districts:
 Caldwell Independent School District
 Snook Independent School District
 Somerville Independent School District

Blinn College is the designated community college for all of the county.

See also

 National Register of Historic Places listings in Burleson County, Texas
 Recorded Texas Historic Landmarks in Burleson County

References

External links
 Burleson County official website
 Burleson County in Handbook of Texas Online at the University of Texas.
 History of Texas, together with a biographical history of Milam, Williamson, Bastrop, Travis, Lee and Burleson counties, hosted by the Portal to Texas History

 
1846 establishments in Texas
Populated places established in 1846
Bryan–College Station